Poltavka is an urban locality (an urban-type settlement) in Poltavsky District of Omsk Oblast, Russia. Population:

References

Urban-type settlements in Omsk Oblast